El Mayorquín is a town in Alquízar, Cuba.

References

External links
 Mayorquín (Alquízar) - EcuRed

Populated places in Artemisa Province